The Small Back Room is a 1943 British thriller novel by Nigel Balchin, a pioneer of the use of computers, who later became Deputy Science Adviser (Army). It makes fun of 'the lesser back-room boy'.

In 1947 it was adapted by the team of Powell and Pressburger as a film of the same title starring David Farrar and Kathleen Byron. Perhaps confusingly, this used the term Boffin to refer to back-room 'boys' rather than to those more like Nigel himself.

References

Bibliography
 Goble, Alan. The Complete Index to Literary Sources in Film. Walter de Gruyter, 1999.
 James, Clive. At the Pillars of Hercules. Pan Macmillan, 2013.

1943 British novels
Novels by Nigel Balchin
British thriller novels
British novels adapted into films
William Collins, Sons books